Joyce "Baby Jean" Kennedy (born 1948) is an American singer raised in Chicago.

Early life and career 
Joyce Kennedy was born in Anguilla, Mississippi, in 1948. Growing up as a young African American woman in Mississippi had little to no effect on young Joyce. This was due to the fact her grandparents were Masons, which allowed the family to own their own property, grow their own produce, and keep away from the racial tensions of the time. Her stay in Mississippi allowed her to enjoy the company of her family. In an interview done by the Jungle Room, Kennedy recalled how her grandmother would play the piano and sing throughout their home and while cousins would play their instruments by ear. Music was a recurring theme in the Kennedy household.
 
After the death of her grandfather when she was 7, Kennedy moved to Chicago with her mother. It was there she began her singing career. In 1963, Joyce released her first single. With the help of Andre Williams, she recorded her first song for Ran-Dee Records. The song Darling I Still Love You became a local hit, which inspired her to further pursue her singing career.

Mother's Finest 

Kennedy met Glenn Murdock, formerly of The Vondells and they started to perform together as a duo and eventually got married. Murdock and Kennedy would form what is considered to be the original black rock band: Mother's Finest. They recruited Gary Moore and Jerry Seay on guitar and bass, respectively. 
 
Mother's Finest was initially signed with RCA but eventually landed at Epic Records, where their third, fourth, and fifth albums were certified gold. They opened for the likes of Ted Nugent, Black Sabbath, The Who, Aerosmith, and AC/DC. The band would go on to sign with Atlantic Records, taking a break after their 1981 album Iron Age while Joyce pursued a solo career. 
 
The band reunited in 1989 for Looks Could Kill at Capitol/EMI, with Joyce and Glenn's son Dion taking over drums from original member Barry Borden. They continued through the 1990s on various labels, releasing and touring primarily in Europe.

Their style came through in songs like Baby Love, where they drew from black gospel roots with a choir-like sound and the pattern of call-response between Joyce and her back-up singers. They incorporate synthesizers to achieve a more modern, technological sound.

Not unlike Nat King Cole at some points in his career, Mother's Finest struggled to establish a strong connection with black fans. This highly affected their touring, for – rather than fighting for a place in American culture at the time – they sought what they thought to be the more forward-thinking, progressive culture of Europe.

Their album Black Radio Won't Play This Record highlights their disconnection from the black music population, and the name of the album itself displays it. The album's tracklist included songs Like a Negro, which differentiated their everyday experiences as black people as a completely different day-to-day experience.

This album touched on many social issues – The Wall talked about the growing separation and segregation in terms of religion, and how it is dividing the world. In Power, Joyce questions what sexuality meant in society at that time: “Times have changed, traditions rearranged… who says I can’t make a move on you, who says I can’t do what a man can do” and “This is my body I do what I want, I’m the one who says if I will or I won’t.”

Touring 

Mother's Finest was known for their interactive and lively performances as well as their progressive music. This led to them being successful in their own way and touring across the world.
 
Mother's Finest is also known as “a very tough act to follow on stage” due to their engaging live shows. This is considered to apply even for very popular bands such as those mentioned above or Santana or Earth, Wind & Fire.
 
Mother's Finest tours in Europe more frequently due to audiences being more open to bands that break grounds musically and racially. Concerts such as Rockpalast in 1978 and in 2016 were the norm to the band. They have had such success with the European crowds that they have even signed a recording deal with German indie label Steamhammer.

Solo career 

Joyce Kennedy's mentor was Andre Williams, who produced nearly all of her singles for different record companies (Ran Dee, Fontana, and Blues Rock Records) when she first began to sing. Darling I Still Love You was her first local hit released in 1963, which launched her singing career. She released her second song with Ran Dee records entitled Can't Take a Chance, but it failed to succeed like her first hit. She then created Paddle My Own Canoe and released it on Fontana Records. Her second local hit was I'm a Good Girl, again with Fontana Records and Williams still helping her write and produce. While performing throughout all of Chicago, she met Glenn Murdock, who became her husband and formed Mother's Finest with her.

In 1984, the band broke up, and Kennedy signed with A&M Records. Lookin' for Trouble was her debut with A&M. Along with that single, she released the singles Stronger Than Before and The Last Time I Made Love, which was a duet with Jeffrey Osborne. The Last Time I Made Love was her most successful single, reaching number 2 on the R&B charts and number 40 on the Billboard Hot 100. Kennedy said the record label tried to have her music appeal to a "predominately black" audience.

Despite going on a "farewell" tour with Mother's Finest in 2017, proclaiming that she would stop touring with Mother's Finest, Joyce Kennedy still tours with Mother's Finest regularly and will embark on a 50-year anniversary tour in 2020.

Joyce Kennedy has a son, Dion, who was raised in her rock 'n’ roll lifestyle.

References

External links
 

1948 births
People from Anguilla, Mississippi
20th-century African-American women singers
American funk singers
Living people
Singers from Mississippi
Singers from Chicago
20th-century American singers
21st-century American singers
American women rock singers
African-American rock singers
20th-century American women singers
21st-century American women singers
21st-century African-American women singers